is a former Japanese football player. She played for Japan national team.

Club career
Morimoto was born in Osaka Prefecture on January 6, 1974. She played for Prima Ham FC Kunoichi. In 1992 season, she was selected Young Player Awards.

National team career
In December 1993, Morimoto was selected Japan national team for 1993 AFC Championship. At this competition, on December 6, she debuted against Philippines. She also played at 1997 AFC Championship. She played 10 games and scored 2 goals for Japan until 1998.

National team statistics

References

External links
uniao-ladies 

1974 births
Living people
Association football people from Osaka Prefecture
Japanese women's footballers
Japan women's international footballers
Nadeshiko League players
Iga FC Kunoichi players
Women's association footballers not categorized by position